Two ships of the Royal Navy have borne the name HMS Pathfinder.

 , launched in 1904, was a light cruiser, the lead ship of her class.
 , launched in 1941, was a P-class destroyer.

Royal Navy ship names